The Victorian Government's Act No. 821, the Railway Construction Act 1884, authorised the construction of 59 new railway lines in the colony, plus additional infrastructure.

Organised by the Minister for Railways, Thomas Bent, and passed on 12 December 1884, it became notorious for the large number of railway lines it authorised, and was dubbed the "Octopus Act". It was accompanied by the Railway Loan Act, No. 760, which permitted the raising of a loan of £600,000 for construction of the various lines.

The act, "to authorize the Construction of certain Lines of Railway by the State and for other purposes", listed 51 "country lines", 8 "suburban lines", 4 short connections and bridges, and 2 "railway[s] or sidings", specifying 65 pieces of new infrastructure in total. It also provided for additional platforms, buildings, sidings, road approaches, drains, bridge widenings and modifications to existing infrastructure as necessary. It allowed for an average expenditure of £3,960 per mile for the country lines, and £14,294 per mile for the suburban lines.

The depression of the 1890s soon rendered many of these lines unviable.

Scheduled lines

Country lines 
 Avoca and Ararat Railway
 Bacchus Marsh and Gordons Railway
 Bacchus Marsh Junction and New-port Railway
 Ballarat East and Buninyong Railway
 Ballarat Cattle Yards Branch Railway
 Ballarat Eacecourse and Springs Railway
 Birregurra and Cape Otway Forest Railway
 Camperdown and Curdie's River Railway
 Camperdown to Terand and Warrnambool Railway
 Coburg and Somerton Railway
 Creswick and Daylesford Railway
 Dandenong and Leongatha Railway
 Dimboola and South Australian Border Railway
 Fitzroy and Whittlesea Railway
 Frankston and Crib Point Railway   15A: Mornington Railway
 Frankston Cemetery Railway
 Hamilton and Coleraine Railway
 Heyfield and Bairns-dale Railway, 
 Horsham and Natimuk Railway
 Inglewood and Dunolly Railway   20A. Kerang to Swan Hill
 Koroit and Belfast Railway
 Koroit Railway via Penshurst   22A. Hamilton and Penshurst Railway
 Koroit and Warrnambool Railway
 Kyneton and Redesdale Railway
 Lancefield and Kilmore Railway
 Leongatha and Port Albert Railway
 Lilydale and Healesville Railway (via Yarra Flats)
 Lubeck and Rupanyup Railway
 Maffra and Briagolong Railway
 Maldon and Laanecoorie Railway
 Moe and Narracan Railway
 Mount Moriac and Forest Railway
 Murchison and Rushworth Rail-way
 Murtoa and Warracknabeal Railway
 Myrtleford and Bright Railway
 Numurkah and Cobram Railway
 Numurkah and Nathalia Railway
 Ondit and Beeac Railway
 Ringwood and Ferntree Gully Railway
 Sale and Stratford Railway
 Scarsdale and Lintons Railway
 Shepparton and Dookie Railway
 St. James and Yarrawonga RAilway
 Tatura and Echuca Railway
 Terang and Mortlake Railway
 Wandong Heathcote and Sandhurst Railway
 Warragul and Neerim Railway
 Wedderburn Road and Wedderburn Railway
 Wodonga and Tallangatta Railway
 Yackandandah and Beechworth Railway
 Yea and Mansfield Railway; Alexandra Branch Railway

Suburban lines 
Schedule numbers are as given.

 52. Alphington and Heidelberg Railway
 53. Brighton and Picnic Point Railway
 54. Burnley to Junction with Outer Circle Railway
 55. Fitzroy Branch Railway
 56. Hawthorn and Kew Railway
 57. Lal Lal Racecourse Railway
 58. Outer Circle Railway, Oakleigh, via Camberwell to Richmond and Alphington Railway
 59. Royal Park and Clifton Hill Railway

Additional infrastructure 
Schedule numbers are as given, with authorised expenditure from Section 7 where given.

 60. Murray-bridge (temporary) (£1,750)
 61. Portland Pier
 62. Murray-bridge (£25,000)
 63. Flinders-street Viaduct (£73,000)
 64. Windsor Siding
 65. Ballarat siding

Section 4 provided for "Additional sidings etc. on existing lines".

Section 7 also authorised expenditure on the following works:

 66. Duplication Hawthorn and Camberwell Line (£8,500)
 67. Railway works (£800,000)
 Rolling-stock (£178,000) and permanent-way (£415,000)

Implementation
The task of implementing the act fell to Richard Speight, Railway Commissioner at the time, a role created by the Victorian Railways Commissioners Act of 1883.

Beneficiaries of the act included construction engineers such as Andrew O'Keefe, and politicians such as Thomas Bent himself, who reaped the rewards of commissioning construction in their own electorates.

Construction of the lines was complete by April 1890.

By 1892, outrage at the excesses of this construction boom, including a number of "white elephants", led to the sacking of Speight, Richard Ford  and A J Agg, the other commissioners. Then, the Railways Act of 1892, attempted to reverse some of the damage.

See also
 Rail transport in Victoria

Sources

External links
Victorian railway map of 1880
Victorian railway map of 1890

Economic history of Victoria (Australia)
Rail transport in Victoria (Australia)
Victoria (Australia) legislation
1884 in Australia
1884 in law
1884 in British law
Railway legislation
History of rail transport in Australia
1884 in rail transport
1880s in Victoria (Australia)